William O'Brien (26 January 1929 – 2015) was an English footballer who played in the Football League for Darlington. A centre half born in Middlesbrough, O'Brien began his football career as a junior with his hometown club, Middlesbrough F.C., and was on the books of Leicester City for the 1947–48 season before serving in the Army. He joined Darlington in February 1950, but did not make his first-team debut for more than a year, when he replaced the injured Geoff Stone on 17 March 1951 for a 4–1 defeat at home to Bradford City. He kept his place for the next Third Division North matchan even heavier defeat, this time away to Hartlepools Unitedbut that was his final appearance.

References

1929 births
2015 deaths
Association football defenders
Darlington F.C. players
English Football League players
English footballers
Leicester City F.C. players
Middlesbrough F.C. players
People from Middlesbrough